Maxemillion Kassman (born 17 July 1998) is a taekwondo athlete from Papua New Guinea.

Kassman has qualified for the 2016 Olympics.

He is the nephew of fellow 2016 Olympic taekwondo qualifier Samantha Kassman.

References

External links

Papua New Guinean male taekwondo practitioners
Living people
Olympic taekwondo practitioners of Papua New Guinea
Taekwondo practitioners at the 2016 Summer Olympics
1998 births